Suzanne Wurtz (26 December 1900 – 27 July 1982) was a French swimmer. She competed at the 1920 Summer Olympics in the 100 m and 300 m freestyle events, but failed to reach the finals.

References

External links
 

1900 births
1982 deaths
French female freestyle swimmers
Swimmers at the 1920 Summer Olympics
Olympic swimmers of France
Swimmers from Paris
20th-century French women